The 2024 World Team Table Tennis Championships are scheduled to be held in Busan, South Korea from 16 to 25 February 2024. Quarterfinalists of the 2024 World Championships will be qualified to the 2024 Summer Olympics.

Cancellation of the 2020 World Championships
Busan was selected as the first South Korean city to host World Table Tennis Championships in 2018. The 2020 World Team Table Tennis Championships were originally scheduled to be held in Busan from 22 to 29 March 2020, but were postponed due to the COVID-19 pandemic, initially until 27 September to 4 October 2020, then until 28 February to 7 March 2021. However, on 22 December it was announced that the event had been cancelled.

In May 2021, Busan launched another bid for the 2024 World Championships, and won the bid in November 2021.

References

 
World Table Tennis Championships
World Team Table Tennis Championships
World Team Table Tennis Championships
Table tennis competitions in South Korea
Sports competitions in Busan
World Table Tennis Championships
World Team Table Tennis Championships
Table tennis